Michael Roll (born 29 April 1961 in Munich) is a German television actor.

Selected filmography 
 1988: 
 1989: Die schnelle Gerdi
 1993: Einmal die Woche
 1994–1996: Der König
 1995: Über Kreuz
 1999: Drei mit Herz
 2000: Rosamunde Pilcher – Der lange Weg zum Glück
 2001: 
 2001: Sieben Tage im Paradies
 2004: Zwei Männer und ein Baby
 2004: Ein Gauner Gottes
 2005: Hengstparade
 2005: M.E.T.R.O. – Ein Team auf Leben und Tod
 2005: Andersrum
 Guest star in Café Meineid, Siska, The Old Fox, Der Fahnder, Derrick, Tatort, Ein Fall für zwei, Polizeiruf 110, Der Bulle von Tölz, Die glückliche Familie and SOKO 5113.

External links 

1961 births
Living people
German male television actors
Male actors from Munich